The A150 autoroute is a short motorway north west of Rouen, France.

Route

Exchange A150/A151 junction with A150 autoroute to Rouen and Yvetot.
02 Eslettes 6 km Towns served: Montville, Eslettes
Exchange A151/A29 Junction with A29 autoroute to Le Havre and Saint-Quentin.
03 Beautot 8 km Road becomes the N27 to Dieppe.

References

External links

 A151 autoroute in Saratlas

A151